In the United States, Certified Pulmonary Function Technician (CPFT) is a medical technician who is at least a Certified Respiratory Therapist and at most a Registered Respiratory Therapist that has successfully passed the national certification exam. A pulmonary function technician assists a Registered Pulmonary Function Technician with performing function tests on patients.  Tests are done both inpatient and outpatient and in specialty clinics such as asthma clinics and sleep centers.

See also
Respiratory therapy

References

Allied health professions
Respiratory therapy